Dražen is a Serbo-Croatian masculine given name, derived from Slavic root drag ("dear, beloved"). Notable people with the name include:

 Dražen Besek (born 1963), Croatian football player and manager
 Dražen Biškup (born 1965), Croatian football player and manager
 Dražen Bolić (born 1971), Serbian football player
 Dražen Brnčić (born 1971), Croatian football player and manager
 Dražen Budiša (born 1948), Croatian politician
 Dražen Dalipagić (born 1951), Serbian basketball player and manager of Bosnian-Herzegovinian origin
 Dražen Erdemović (born 1971), Bosnian soldier and war criminal of Serb and Croat descent
 Dražen Gović (1981–2022), Croatian football player
 Mirko Dražen Grmek (1924–2000), Croatian and French historian of medicine
 Dražen Funtak (born 1975), Croatian sprint canoer
 Dražen Ladić (born 1963), Croatian football player and manager
 Dražen Lalić (born 1960), Croatian sociologist
 Dražen Marović (born 1938), Croatian chess player
 Dražen Mužinić (born 1953), Croatian football player
 Dražen Petrović (1964–1993), Yugoslav and Croatian basketball player
 Dražen Prćić (born 1967), Serbian Croat novelist
 Dražen Ričl (1962–1986), Bosnian rock musician and comedian of Czech and Bosniak descent
 Dražen Žerić (born 1964), Bosnian singer of Bosniak descent

See also
Dražan
Alexis Drazen

Croatian masculine given names